Lee Sang-geun (born 15 June 1962) is a South Korean long-distance runner. He competed in the men's 10,000 metres at the 1988 Summer Olympics.

References

1962 births
Living people
Athletes (track and field) at the 1988 Summer Olympics
South Korean male long-distance runners
Olympic athletes of South Korea
Place of birth missing (living people)
20th-century South Korean people